Alltddu Halt railway station served the hamlet of Allt-ddu, located between Lampeter and Aberystwyth on the Carmarthen Aberystwyth Line in the Welsh county of Ceredigion. The Ystwyth Trail, a multi-use rail trail, now passes the site on the trackbed of the former railway.

History

Opened by the Great Western Railway, the station passed on to British Railways on nationalisation in 1948. It was then closed by the British Railways Board. Although proposed for closure in the Beeching Report serious damage due to flooding south of Aberystwyth closed that section in December 1964. The cost of repairs was deemed unjustified and led to the withdrawal of passenger services in February 1965, however milk trains continued to run from Carmarthen to nearby Pont Llanio until 1970.

References

Sources

External links
 Station on navigable O.S. map

Disused railway stations in Ceredigion
Beeching closures in Wales
Railway stations in Great Britain opened in 1935
Railway stations in Great Britain closed in 1965
Former Great Western Railway stations
1935 establishments in Wales
1965 disestablishments in Wales